The Communauté de communes de la Région d'Audruicq is the communauté de communes, an intercommunal structure, centred on the town of Audruicq. It is located in the Pas-de-Calais department, in the Hauts-de-France region, northern France. It was created on 1 January 1994. Its seat is in Audruicq. Its area is 220.0 km2. Its population was 27,630 in 2018, of which 5,422 in Audruicq proper.

Composition
The communauté de communes consists of the following 15 communes:

Audruicq  
Guemps 
Muncq-Nieurlet  
Nortkerque 
Nouvelle-Église 
Offekerque 
Oye-Plage 
Polincove 
Recques-sur-Hem 
Ruminghem 
Sainte-Marie-Kerque   
Saint-Folquin  
Saint-Omer-Capelle
Vieille-Église 
Zutkerque

References 

Audruicq
Audruicq